J. Henry Bennett (1876-1956) was a member of the Wisconsin State Senate.

Biography
Bennett was born on November 18, 1876 and died on April 29, 1956. He was buried in Viroqua, Wisconsin.

Career
Bennett was first elected to the Senate in 1914. Additionally, he was District Attorney of Vernon County, Wisconsin. He was a Republican.

References

External links

People from Viroqua, Wisconsin
Republican Party Wisconsin state senators
District attorneys in Wisconsin
1876 births
1956 deaths
Burials in Wisconsin
Place of birth missing